Amjad Farid (Fareed) Sabri (23 December 1976 – 22 June 2016) was a Pakistani qawwal, naat khawan and a proponent of the Sufi Muslim tradition. Son of Ghulam Farid Sabri and nephew of Maqbool Ahmed Sabri of the Sabri Brothers, he emerged as one of South Asia's most prominent qawwali singers, often reciting poems written by his father and uncle. The TTP Hakimullah Mehsud group has claimed responsibility for Sabri's death, saying that they carried out the assassination "for blasphemy."

Career

Born in Karachi, Sindh, Amjad began learning qawwali music from his father at age nine and joined his father on stage to perform in 1982. His father trained him in Raag Bhairon,  which is practiced in early morning.  For this training Sabri had to get out of bed in the middle of the night, then after performing tahajjud (a midnight prayer), he practiced the baja.  Sabri presented the work of his family and travelled widely to India, America and Europe where he was known as the "rock star" of qawwali. From then on he remained one of the most acclaimed qawwali singers on the Indian subcontinent and performed around the world.

Amjad used to be in the chorus and would clap in his father's and uncle's band the Sabri Brothers. He also appeared alongside his father Ghulam Farid Sabri and uncle Maqbool Ahmed Sabri at the age of 6 years old, along with the Sabri Brothers in Pakistani film Saharay which was released in 1982. In which his father and uncle recited their famous golden hit Tajdar-e-Haram. Amjad also recited Allama Iqbal's poem Lab Pe Aati Hai Dua in the same film. After his father's death, The Sabri Brothers were led by Amjad's uncle Maqbool Ahmed Sabri, Amjad took up the role of a supporting vocalist and also used to play the Bongos. Later, in 1996, he started his own group with his brothers and friends as members. His first album was Balaghal Ola Be Kamalehi which was released by Oriental star agencies in 1997 which featured his father's and uncle's golden hit Sar E La Makan Se Talab Hui as the main item. He mostly used to recite poetry sung by his father and uncle, then eventually began to include some of his own compositions. Some of his hit Qawwalis included Ali Ke Sath Hai Zehra Ki Shaadi and Na Poochiye Ke Kya Hussain Hai. His most popular song is a Naat Karam Maangta Hoon. 
His other works include Main Nazar Karoon Jaan E Jigar, Allah Allah, Dhoom Macha Do, Kaabe Ki Raunaq, Kaash Yeh Dua Meri, Ali Mera Dil, Phir Dikha De Haram, Tuloo E Saher Hai Shaam-E-Qalandar and his last Naat Aye Sabz Gumbad Wale.

Sabri's last musical project was with Coke Studio. He performed an outstanding qawwali, "Aaj Rang Hai" with Rahat Fateh Ali Khan in Episode 7 of Season 9. Sabri's performance on the platform came out to be his first and last one.

Personal life 
Amjad Sabri is fondly remembered by friends and family as a warm and affable person who was always smiling, and had a love for board games and a childish tendency to play pranks. He married his wife Nadia after being introduced to her in 2002 through mutual friends. Nadia and Sabri have five children together. Sabri was known to be a family man who preferred to spend time with his wife and children despite his hectic career and travelling commitments and felt homesick when travelling abroad. Friends who knew him closely also considered him somewhat of an eccentric and an outspoken misfit. Sabri preferred to live in his humble Liaqatabad residence even after achieving world fame and refused to move to a more affluent area due to his spiritual association with the home built by his father.

Death
On 22 June 2016, after finishing a morning TV show where his last naat included the words "When I shudder in my dark tomb, dear Prophet, look after me", two motorcyclists opened fire on Sabri's car in Liaquatabad Town, Karachi, critically injuring Sabri, an associate and his driver. Sabri was shot twice in the head and once on the ear. All of the passengers were then shifted to Abbasi Shaheed Hospital where Sabri died shortly after. His assassination occurred near an underpass named after his father.

Tens of thousands of people attended Amjad Sabri's funeral in Karachi. He was buried near the graves of his father Ghulam Farid Sabri and uncle Maqbool Ahmed Sabri at Paposh Qabristan, in Nazimabad.

Sabri's murder was met with condemnation from many public figures in Pakistan and India, and several protests were organised against the killing. Several songs, music videos were made, and articles were published, to pay a tribute to Sabri. In addition, Sabri was paid tribute in several shows and award ceremonies in Pakistan. Since Sabri's death, several concerts have been held around the world in his tribute. In 2016, a Qawal group held a concert in the United States in a tribute to Sabri, which was attended by thousands of people.

Perpetrators
Following Sabri's assassination, one of the workers of political party, Muttahida Qaumi Movement (MQM), was arrested by security forces. The arrested worker, Shahzad Mullah, admitted that he was responsible for the murder of Amjad Sabri. Shahzad Mullah stated that a six-member team was formed, comprising two MQM workers from Liaquatabad, to attack Amjad Sabri. He disclosed that Amjad Sabri was not paying extortion to the party, which was the reason for his murder.

According to local Pakistani media like Dawn News, Tehrik-i-Taliban Pakistan (TTP) also claimed responsibility for killing Amjad Sabri. The responsibility was claimed by the group's spokesman, Qari Saifullah Mehsud. Qari Saifullah Mehsud was later shot dead by an unknown gunman in Khost province of Afghanistan on 29 December 2019. Mehsud was a key TTP commander and was among the terrorists most wanted by Pakistan for his involvement in several terror attacks in the country. He was previously arrested by U.S. forces in Afghanistan in 2016 but was later released after he spent 14 weeks in jail in Afghanistan.

Legacy
Amjad Sabri was awarded Pride of Performance by the Government of Pakistan.
In 2018, Sabri was posthumously awarded the Sitara-i-Imtiaz – Pakistan's third highest civilian honour – by President Mamnoon Hussain.
Amjad Sabri's voice featured in the track "Church" on Coldplay's 2019 album Everyday Life.

References

External links

Pakistani terrorism victims
1970 births
2016 deaths
Harmonium players
Pakistani qawwali singers
Crime in Karachi
People killed by the Tehrik-i-Taliban Pakistan
Targeted killings in Pakistan
People murdered in Karachi
Pakistani Sufis
Pakistani murder victims
Deaths by firearm in Sindh
Recipients of Sitara-i-Imtiaz
Muhajir people
Chishti-Sabiris